FIH Pro League may refer to:

Men's FIH Pro League, a tournament in men's field hockey
Women's FIH Pro League, a tournament in women's field hockey